HMS Uva was a Royal Navy rest camp at Diyatalawa, in British Ceylon.

The camp was reportedly built as a prisoner of war camp for use in the Boer War in 1900, and was used as a Royal Naval Auxiliary Hospital in the Second World War. The rest camp was commissioned as an independent command under the name Uva on 1 December 1945.

The camp's accounts were transferred to HMS Lanka in 1957, and the camp was transferred to the Air Ministry on 30 September 1958.

Nominal Depot Ships
Uva had several nominal depot ships during her career:

See also
Diyatalawa Garrison

References
Citations

Bibliography

Military of British Ceylon
Military medical installations
Royal Navy shore establishments
World War II sites in Sri Lanka
Military units and formations of Ceylon in World War II